Duwana Muwan (A silent violence) is a 2014 Sri Lankan Sinhala children's film directed by Indra Weerasekara and produced by Mano Weerasekara. It stars Uddika Premarathna and Pabasara Diddeniya in lead roles with Maurine Charuni and child actor Kaushalya Nirmana. Music co-composed by Somapala Rathnayake and Gayathri Khemadasa. It is the 1244th Sri Lankan film in the Sinhala cinema.

Plot

Sama is Sinhala language teacher by profession in her village school. She is married to Amara who has done his tertiary education abroad. Their only son is Dhanushka. The school where Sama teaches is very poor in English although she is a Sinhala teacher she starts to teach English in a new way. She uses new methods which are easy to remember for many children. In the meantime, having realized the ingratitude of some of the school teachers Amara plans to leave Sri Lanka with Sama and their son. She is reluctant to leave. This leads to a conflict within Sama's family.

Cast
 Kaushalya Nirmana as Dhanushka (Dhanu)
 Uddika Premarathna as Amara
 Pabasara Diddeniya as Saama
 Nissanka Diddeniya as Saama's father
 Ferni Roshini as Miss Chandani
 Maureen Charuni
 Nilmini Kottegoda as Miss Duleeka

Soundtrack

References

External links
උගතමනා ශිල්පයේ අගය කියාදෙන “දුවන මුවන්” ළඟදීම රිදී තිරයට

2014 films
2010s Sinhala-language films